Masdevallia striatella is a species of orchid that occurs from Costa Rica to western Panama.

References

External links 

striatella
Orchids of Costa Rica
Orchids of Panama